Howz-e Mahi (also Romanized as Ḩowẕ-e Māhī, Hauz-i-Māhi, and Ḩowz Māhī) is a village in Talkhuncheh Rural District, in the Central District of Mobarakeh County, Isfahan Province, Iran. At the 2006 census, its population was 462, in 110 families.

References 

Populated places in Mobarakeh County